Ronny Rivano is a Dutch mixed martial artist. He competed in the Welterweight division.

Mixed martial arts record

|-
| Loss
| align=center | 13-13-3
| Chico Martinez
| KO (punches)
| Bushido Europe: Rotterdam Rumble
| 
| align=center | 1
| align=center | 1:37
| Rotterdam, South Holland, Netherlands
|
|-
| Loss
| align=center | 13-12-3
| Robbie Nelson
| KO (punch)
| Rings Holland: One Moment In Time
| 
| align=center | 1
| align=center | 3:01
| Utrecht, Netherlands
|
|-
| Loss
| align=center | 13-11-3
| Gilbert Ballentine
| KO (punch)
| Rings Holland: Saved by the Bell
| 
| align=center | 2
| align=center | 1:20
| Amsterdam, North Holland, Netherlands
|
|-
| Loss
| align=center | 13-10-3
| Musail Alaudinov
| Submission (rear-naked choke)
| M-1 MFC: Russia vs. the World 3
| 
| align=center | 1
| align=center | 0:58
| Saint Petersburg, Russia
|
|-
| Win
| align=center | 13-9-3
| Stephan Tapilatu
| TKO (leg injury)
| 2H2H 4: Simply the Best 4
| 
| align=center | 0
| align=center | N/A
| Rotterdam, South Holland, Netherlands
|
|-
| Loss
| align=center | 12-9-3
| Andrey Rudakov
| TKO (punches)
| IAFC: Pankration World Championship 2001
| 
| align=center | 1
| align=center | 0:56
| Yaroslavl, Russia
|
|-
| Win
| align=center | 12-8-3
| Danila Veselov
| TKO (punches)
| M-1 MFC: Russia vs. the World 2
| 
| align=center | 1
| align=center | 1:45
| Saint Petersburg, Russia
|
|-
| Win
| align=center | 11-8-3
| Stephan Tapilatu
| Submission (rear-naked choke)
| 2H2H 3: Hotter Than Hot
| 
| align=center | 1
| align=center | 4:19
| Rotterdam, South Holland, Netherlands
|
|-
| Win
| align=center | 10-8-3
| Sergei Zavadsky
| TKO (punches)
| M-1 MFC: Russia vs. the World 1
| 
| align=center | 1
| align=center | 7:30
| Saint Petersburg, Russia
|
|-
| Loss
| align=center | 9-8-3
| Sergei Bytchkov
| Submission (arm triangle choke)
| 2H2H 2: Simply The Best
| 
| align=center | 1
| align=center | 4:40
| Rotterdam, South Holland, Netherlands
|
|-
| Draw
| align=center | 9-7-3
| Robbie Nelson
| Draw
| It's Showtime: Exclusive
| 
| align=center | 2
| align=center | 5:00
| Haarlem, North Holland, Netherlands
|
|-
| Loss
| align=center | 9-7-2
| Rafles la Rose
| Submission
| BOA 2: Battle of Arnhem 2
| 
| align=center | 0
| align=center | 0:00
| Netherlands
|
|-
| Win
| align=center | 9-6-2
| Marco Holkamp
| TKO (strikes)
| 2H2H 1: 2 Hot 2 Handle
| 
| align=center | 1
| align=center | 9:30
| Amsterdam, North Holland, Netherlands
|
|-
| Win
| align=center | 8-6-2
| Peter Kaljevic
| Decision
| AAC 2: Amsterdam Absolute Championship 2
| 
| align=center | 1
| align=center | 10:00
| Amsterdam, North Holland, Netherlands
|
|-
| Draw
| align=center | 7-6-2
| Ron Post
| Draw
| It's Showtime: It's Showtime
| 
| align=center | 2
| align=center | 5:00
| Haarlem, North Holland, Netherlands
|
|-
| Win
| align=center | 7-6-1
| Marco Holkamp
| TKO (cut)
| WVC 9: World Vale Tudo Championship 9
| 
| align=center | 1
| align=center | 3:00
| Aruba
|
|-
| Loss
| align=center | 6-6-1
| Rafles la Rose
| Submission (triangle choke)
| IMA: Night of the Knights 1
| 
| align=center | 0
| align=center | 0:00
| Badhoevedorp, North Holland, Netherlands
|
|-
| Win
| align=center | 6-5-1
| Pedro van Hemert
| TKO (broken nose)
| IMA: Back to the Roots
| 
| align=center | 0
| align=center | 0:00
| Netherlands
|
|-
| Win
| align=center | 5-5-1
| Pedro van Hemert
| Submission (choke)
| AAC 1: Amsterdam Absolute Championship 1
| 
| align=center | 1
| align=center | 1:58
| Amsterdam, North Holland, Netherlands
|
|-
| Loss
| align=center | 4-5-1
| Hayato Sakurai
| Submission (rear naked choke)
| Shooto: Las Grandes Viajes 4
| 
| align=center | 1
| align=center | 1:10
| Tokyo, Japan
|
|-
| Win
| align=center | 4-4-1
| Oleg Zakharov
| Submission (rear naked choke)
| IAFC: Pankration European Championship 1998
| 
| align=center | 1
| align=center | 6:13
| Moscow, Russia
|
|-
| Win
| align=center | 3-4-1
| Vincent Vielvoye
| TKO (punches)
| IMA: KO Power Tournament
| 
| align=center | 1
| align=center | 1:11
| Amsterdam, North Holland, Netherlands
|
|-
| Win
| align=center | 2-4-1
| Elton Rol
| Submission (rear naked choke)
| RDFF 2: Red Devil Free Fight 2
| 
| align=center | 0
| align=center | 2:43
| Amsterdam, North Holland, Netherlands
|
|-
| Loss
| align=center | 1-4-1
| Sergei Bytchkov
| Submission (achilles lock)
| M-1 MFC: World Championship 1997
| 
| align=center | 1
| align=center | 2:51
| Saint Petersburg, Russia
|
|-
| Win
| align=center | 1-3-1
| Nikita Abramov
| Submission (forearm choke)
| M-1 MFC: World Championship 1997
| 
| align=center | 1
| align=center | 4:50
| Saint Petersburg, Russia
|
|-
| Loss
| align=center | 0-3-1
| Sergei Bytchkov
| Submission (achilles lock)
| RDFF 1: Red Devil Free Fight 1
| 
| align=center | 3
| align=center | 1:43
| Amsterdam, North Holland, Netherlands
|
|-
| Loss
| align=center | 0-2-1
| Jonny van Wanrooy
| Decision (unanimous)
| Rings Holland: Utrecht at War
| 
| align=center | 2
| align=center | 5:00
| Utrecht, Netherlands
|
|-
| Draw
| align=center | 0-1-1
| Olaf van der Broek
| Draw
| IMA: Battle of Styles
| 
| align=center | 0
| align=center | 0:00
| Netherlands
|
|-
| Loss
| align=center | 0-1
| Piet Bernzen
| Decision (unanimous)
| Rings Holland: Free Fight
| 
| align=center | 1
| align=center | 10:00
| Amsterdam, North Holland, Netherlands
|

See also
 List of male mixed martial artists

References

Living people
Year of birth missing (living people)
Place of birth missing (living people)
Dutch male mixed martial artists
Welterweight mixed martial artists
Mixed martial artists utilizing karate
Dutch male karateka
World Games bronze medalists
Competitors at the 1993 World Games
World Games medalists in karate
20th-century Dutch people
21st-century Dutch people